Kai (stylized as KAI (开)) is the debut eponymous extended play by South Korean singer Kai. It was released on November 30, 2020 by SM Entertainment. The album features six tracks including the lead single, "Mmmh". The physical album is available in seven different versions (3 Photobook versions, 3 Jewel case versions and 1 Flipbook version).

Background
On July 3, SM Entertainment announced that Kai would release his first solo album, and was working on the album production with the goal of the second half of 2020.

On November 11, it was announced that Kai will make his solo debut on November 30, with his 1st mini-album Kai.

Kai's debut single title "음 (Mmmh)", was announced on November 19.

Composition
The title song "음 (Mmmh)" is an R&B pop rock song with a simple yet addictive melody on a minimalist track, it is also described to be a charming, straight-forward love song.

"Nothing on Me" is a PBR&B song featuring a heavy bass groove. It portrayed the moment when the protagonist getting intoxicated by the scent of the other person while moving closer them.

"기억상실 (Amnesia)" is an R&B and trap song with attractive grooves and melody. It discusses the moment when the protagonist is falling in love and forgetting all memories from the past, only want to fill in the memories with the current partner.

"Reason" is a progressive R&B song composed by American producer Mike Daley, with an addictive 808 pattern added to minimal club music, and the lyrics are intriguing about searching for one another, and eventually become fascinated to each other.

"Ride or Die" is a PBR&B song created by producer Cha Cha Malone, it incorporates oriental guitar sound and a dreamy atmosphere. The lyrics are about stepping out of the boundaries to enjoy life.

"Hello Stranger" is a progressive R&B song that stands out with a lyrical guitar sound, the lyrics depict a situation which a person feels a sense of sympathy to a stranger.

Release and promotion
A video highlight "Film: Kai" was released on November 27, a video consists of the performance videos from all of the 6 tracks. The video was released on V Live, Naver, and YouTube. The video is said to raise anticipation for fans, and the inspiration for the concept come from various movies.

Kai appeared on DoReMi Market along with VIXX's Ravi, where he played along with the other cast members and gave spoiler to Mmmh's point dance in the show.

On November 30, the official music video for "Mmmh" was released at 12pm KST, 6 hours before the album's release. The music video incorporates various sci-fi like materials, and shows Kai's teleportation skill, which is his assigned superpower in Exo. An hour after the music video release, Kai appeared on Kim Shinyoung Noon Song of Hope Radio to promote the album and talked about various things related to the album. Exactly an hour before the album's release, Kai hosted a V Live broadcast where he promoted and discussed about the album with fans through interactive comments. Kai performed "Mmmh" for the first time on Naver Now Party B.

Track listing

Charts

Certifications

Release history

References 

2020 debut EPs
Kai (entertainer, born 1994) EPs
Korean-language EPs
SM Entertainment EPs